Marcus Bartlett Giamatti (born October 3, 1961) is an American actor. He is best known for being a regular member of the cast of the CBS drama series Judging Amy.

Early life
Giamatti was born on October 3, 1961, in New Haven, Connecticut, and is the son of Toni Marilyn (née Smith) and former Yale University president and Major League Baseball commissioner A. Bartlett Giamatti, and older brother of Academy Award-nominated actor Paul Giamatti. He attended The Foote School, Hopkins School, Bowdoin College in Brunswick, Maine, where he was a member of the Delta Kappa Epsilon and Delta Sigma fraternities, and Yale University in New Haven. He is a graduate of the Yale School of Drama, where he received the Carole Dye Award for Excellence in Acting.

Career
Giamatti started his career on the soap opera One Life to Live, but is likely best known for his series regular role on the CBS drama series Judging Amy, where he played the title character's older brother Peter Gray throughout the series' six season run. He has also guest-starred on a number of popular series, such as The X-Files, Homicide: Life on the Street, Monk, The Mentalist, House M.D. and Criminal Minds.  He has less frequently appeared in films, which include Mr. and Mrs. Bridge, Necessary Roughness, and the television docudrama Pirates of Silicon Valley.

An accomplished musician, Giamatti plays bass guitar in several bands in Los Angeles, including the alternative folk-rock group Olivea and the psychedelic jam band Rebel Soul. He is also a session musician and is a member of Musicians Local 47.

Giamatti tossed the ceremonial first pitch at the 1989 World Series opener, played in Oakland, California.

From 2010–14, he has guest starred on series including Fringe, The Closer, Revenge, Bones and NCIS: Los Angeles.

He is an associate professor of theatre (tenure track) and head of directing at Temple University in Philadelphia, Pennsylvania, where he teaches acting and directing and regularly directs Temple Theaters productions.

Filmography

Film

Television

References

External links
 

1961 births
20th-century American bass guitarists
American male soap opera actors
American male television actors
Bowdoin College alumni
Living people
Male actors from New Haven, Connecticut
University of California, Santa Barbara faculty
Yale School of Drama alumni